The Shan language (written Shan: , , spoken Shan: ,  or , ; , ;) is the native language of the Shan people and is mostly spoken in Shan State, Myanmar. It is also spoken in pockets in other parts of Myanmar, in Northern Thailand, in Yunnan, in Laos, in Cambodia, in Vietnam and decreasingly in Assam and Meghalaya. Shan is a member of the Tai–Kadai language family and is related to Thai. It has five tones, which do not correspond exactly to Thai tones, plus a sixth tone used for emphasis. The term Shan is also used for related Northwestern Tai languages, and it is called Tai Yai or Tai Long in other Tai languages. Standard Shan, which is also known as Tachileik Shan, is based on the dialect of the city of Tachileik.

The number of Shan speakers is not known in part because the Shan population is unknown. Estimates of Shan people range from four million to 30 million, with about half speaking the Shan language. Ethnologue estimates that there are  million Shan speakers in Myanmar; the Mahidol University Institute for Language and Culture gave the number of Shan speakers in Thailand as 95,000 in 2006, though including refugees from Burma they now total about one million. Many Shan speak local dialects as well as the language of their trading partners. Due to the civil war in Burma, few Shan today can read or write in Shan alphabet, which was derived from the Burmese alphabet.

Names 
The Shan language has a number of names in different Tai languages and Burmese. 
 In Shan, the language is commonly called kwam tai.
 In Burmese, it is called hram: bhasa, whence the English word "Shan". The term "Shan," which was formerly spelt  (hsyam:) in Burmese, is an exonym believed to be a Burmese derivative of "Siam" (an old term for Thailand).
 In Thai and Southern Thai, it is called phasa thai yai (ภาษาไทใหญ่) or more informally or even vulgarly by some phasa ngiao (ภาษาเงี้ยว, an outdated term that now sounds like the word for "snake").
 In Northern Thai, it is called kam tai (กำไต, literally "Tai language") or more informally or even vulgarly by some kam ngiao (กำเงี้ยว)).
 In Lao, it is called phasa tai yai (ພາສາໄທໃຫຍ່) or more informally or even vulgarly by some phasa ngiao (ພາສາງ້ຽວ).
 In Tai Lü, it is called kam ngio.

Dialects
The Shan dialects spoken in Shan State can be divided into three groups, roughly coinciding with geographical and modern administrative boundaries, namely the northern, southern, and eastern dialects. Dialects differ to a certain extent in vocabulary and pronunciation, but are generally mutually intelligible. While the southern dialect has borrowed more Burmese words, Eastern Shan is somewhat closer to northern Thai languages and Lao in vocabulary and pronunciation, and the northern so-called "Chinese Shan" is much influenced by the Yunnan-Chinese dialect. A number of words differ in initial consonants. In Chinese Shan, initial  becomes .

Prominent dialects are considered as separate languages, such as Khün (called Kon Shan by the Burmese), which is spoken in Kengtung valley, and Tai Lü. Chinese Shan is also called (Tai) Mao, referring to the old Shan State of Mong Mao. 'Tai Long' is used to refer to the dialect spoken in southern and central regions west of the Salween River. There are also dialects still spoken by a small number of people in Kachin State and Khamti spoken in northern Sagaing Region.

J. Marvin Brown (1965) divides the three dialects of Shan as follows:
Northern — Lashio, Burma; contains more Chinese influences
Southern — Taunggyi, Burma (capital of Shan State); contains more Burmese influences
Eastern — Kengtung, Burma (in the Golden Triangle); closer to Northern Tai and Lao

Phonology

Consonants
Shan has 19 consonants.
Unlike Thai and Lao there are no voiced plosives [d] and [b].

Vowels and diphthongs 
Shan has ten vowels and 13 diphthongs:

Shan has less vowel complexity than Thai, and Shan people learning Thai have difficulties with sounds such as "ia," "ua," and "uea" . Triphthongs are absent. Shan has no systematic distinction between long and short vowels characteristic of Thai.

Tones 
Shan has phonemic contrasts among the tones of syllables. There are five to six tonemes in Shan, depending on the dialect. The sixth tone is only spoken in the north; in other parts it is only used for emphasis.

Contrastive tones in unchecked syllables 
The table below presents six phonemic tones in unchecked syllables, i.e. closed syllables ending in sonorant sounds such as [m], [n], [ŋ], [w], and [j] and open syllables.

* The symbol in the first column corresponds to conventions used for other tonal languages; the second is derived from the Shan orthography.

The following table shows an example of the phonemic tones:

The Shan tones correspond to Thai tones as follows:
 The Shan rising tone is close to the Thai rising tone.
 The Shan low tone is equivalent to the Thai low tone.
 The Shan mid-tone is different from the Thai mid-tone. It falls in the end.
 The Shan high tone is close to the Thai high tone. But it is not rising.
 The Shan falling tone is different from the Thai falling tone. It is short, creaky and ends with a glottal stop.

Contrastive tones in checked syllables 
The table below presents four phonemic tones in checked syllables, i.e. closed syllables ending in a glottal stop [ʔ] and obstruent sounds such as [p], [t], and [k].

Syllable structure
The syllable structure of Shan is C(G)V((V)/(C)), which is to say the onset consists of a consonant optionally followed by a glide, and the rhyme consists of a monophthong alone, a monophthong with a consonant, or a diphthong alone. (Only in some dialects, a diphthong may also be followed by a consonant.) 
The glides are: -w-, -y- and -r-.

Some representative words are:
CV  also
CVC  market
CGV  to go
CGVC  broad
CVV  far
CGVV  water buffalo

Typical Shan words are monosyllabic. Multisyllabic words are mostly Pali loanwords, or Burmese words with the initial weak syllable .

Pronouns

Resources
Given the present instabilities in Burma, one choice for scholars is to study the Shan people and their language in Thailand, where estimates of Shan refugees run as high as two million, and Mae Hong Son Province is home to a Shan majority. The major source for information about the Shan language in English is Dunwoody Press's Shan for English Speakers. They also publish a Shan-English dictionary.  Aside from this, the language is almost completely undescribed in English.

References

Further reading
 Sai Kam Mong. The History and Development of the Shan Scripts. Chiang Mai, Thailand: Silkworm Books, 2004. 
 The Major Languages of East and South-East Asia. Bernard Comrie (London, 1990).
 A Guide to the World's Languages. Merritt Ruhlen (Stanford, 1991).
 Shan for English Speakers. Irving I. Glick & Sao Tern Moeng (Dunwoody Press, Wheaton, 1991).
 Shan - English Dictionary. Sao Tern Moeng (Dunwoody Press, Kensington, 1995).
Shan phonology and morphology. Aggasena Lengtai. (MA thesis, Mahidol University, 2009).
 An English and Shan Dictionary. H. W. Mix (American Baptist Mission Press, Rangoon, 1920; Revised edition by S.H.A.N., Chiang Mai, 2001).
 Grammar of the Shan Language. J. N. Cushing (American Baptist Mission Press, Rangoon, 1887).
 Myanmar - Unicode Consortium

External links

An English-Shan dictionary translator
Shan-language Swadesh vocabulary list of basic words (from Wiktionary's Swadesh-list appendix)
Shan Alphabet
Basic Shan phrases
SIL Padauk Font (Shan Unicode)
SEAlang Library Shan Dictionary
Titles of Shan-foreign language dictionaries

 
Languages of Myanmar
Languages of Thailand
Southwestern Tai languages
Tonal languages